Larry Jusdanis (born December 3, 1970) is a former Canadian football quarterback who played two seasons in the Canadian Football League with the Hamilton Tiger-Cats and Montreal Alouettes. He was drafted by the BC Lions in the fifth round of the 1995 CFL Draft. He played CIS football at Acadia University. Jusdanis was also a member of the Toronto Argonauts.

Professional career

BC Lions
Jusdanis was drafted by the BC Lions with the 47th pick in the 1995 CFL Draft. He was traded to the Hamilton Tiger-Cats for Roger Hennig in May 1996.

Hamilton Tiger-Cats
Jusdanis started a game for the Tiger-Cats against the Calgary Stampeders in July 1996 after injuries to Matt Dunigan and Anthony Calvillo. Against the Stampeders, he threw one touchdown pass and three interceptions, losing to opposing quarterback Jeff Garcia.(cfl-scrapbook) He was released by the Tiger-Cats in October 1996 and re-signed by the team in May 1997. He was released by the Tiger-Cats in June 1997.

Montreal Alouettes
Jusdanis signed with the Montreal Alouettes on September 20, 1997. He was released by the Alouettes in May 1998.

Toronto Argonauts
Jusdanis attended training camp with the Toronto Argonauts in 2001 and was released before the start of the season.(cfl-scrapbook)

References

cfl-scrapbook.no-ip.org/CFL-CanadianQB.php (link currently blacklisted)

External links
Just Sports Stats

Living people
1970 births
Canadian football quarterbacks
Acadia Axemen football players
BC Lions players
Hamilton Tiger-Cats players
Montreal Alouettes players
Toronto Argonauts players
Players of Canadian football from Ontario
Sportspeople from Hamilton, Ontario